Jyri Niemi (born June 15, 1990) is a Finnish former professional ice hockey defenceman. Niemi was selected by the New York Islanders in the 3rd round (72nd overall) of the 2008 NHL Entry Draft.

Playing career
Niemi played three seasons in major junior, with the Saskatoon Blades of the Western Hockey League. Unable to agree to terms with the Islanders on May 5, 2010, Niemi's rights were traded by the Islanders to neighboring rivals, the New York Rangers in exchange for a sixth-round draft pick. He was immediately signed to a three-year entry-level contract to begin his professional career.

On May 17, 2013, HPK of the Finnish Liiga announced they had signed Niemi to play for the 2013–14 season.

Career statistics

Regular season and playoffs

International

References

External links

1990 births
Living people
Connecticut Whale (AHL) players
Finnish ice hockey defencemen
Greenville Road Warriors players
People from Hämeenkyrö
Hartford Wolf Pack players
HPK players
Ilves players
KooKoo players
New York Islanders draft picks
Saskatoon Blades players
Sportspeople from Pirkanmaa
Vaasan Sport players